Far Cotton is a district in the civil parish of Far Cotton and Delapre, in the town of Northampton, in the county of Northamptonshire, England and many years ago a village in its own right. The population is included in the Delapre and Briar Hill Ward of Northampton Borough Council.

Location
Far Cotton is due south of the town centre, beyond Cotton End - hence the 'Far' - and just south of the River Nene. It is roughly rectangular in shape with the river and Northampton branch of the Grand Union Canal forming its northern boundary. The railway line, part of the Northampton Loop Line just south of Northampton railway station is on the western edge. The A5076 ring road is the southern boundary and Delapré Abbey's park forms the eastern boundary up to the A45 road.

Administration
From elections on and after 2011, Far Cotton is in the Parish of St Mary and Delapre Ward of the Northampton Borough Council. On Northampton County Council Far Cotton is in Delapre and Rushmere Division.

History 
Far Cotton was first recorded in 1196 under the name Cotes. That name derived from the Old English "Cot" meaning a cottage or hut, Cotes being a plural form. Cotton derives from the same word and is also plural and thus meant "cottages" or "huts."  Historically Far Cotton was a hamlet in the parish and urban district of Hardingstone. It expanded with the arrival of the Northampton and Peterborough Railway, opened in 1845. The original line, on which Northampton Bridge Street railway station was situated, was entirely south of the Nene while the medieval town was north of the river.

St Mary's Church was built in Towcester Road in 1885 to the design of Matthew Holding.

There was an iron ore quarry at Far Cotton from 1883 to 1889 run by the Hunsbury Hill Iron Company. The quarry was bounded by Rothersthorpe Road on the north, Towcester Road on the east and the main railway on the west. At the southern end of the quarry it extended across the top of the northern end of the railway tunnel. Much of the site is now built on. The ore was taken by horse-drawn tramway through a bridge under Rothersthorpe Road to the Northampton Blisworth Railway west of  the junction with the  line linking Bridge Street with  the present station (Castle Station.). From there it was taken by rail to the company's ironworks near Duston Mill.

Far Cotton became a separate civil parish in 1895 and an urban district in 1896. The urban district was abolished in 1900 when the County Borough of Northampton was expanded to include Far Cotton; the civil parish continued to exist until 1932. Far Cotton is in the ecclesiastical parish of St Mary.

Current developments
As part of the regeneration of the town, overseen by the West Northamptonshire Development Corporation, many brownfield sites in Far Cotton are undergoing redevelopment in the first decade of the twenty-first century including the new housing estates of Riverside Wharf, Cotton End and Southbridge. Extensive development is to occur on former disused warehouses east of Far Cotton. Nunn Mills is currently under development to build over 3,000 new houses on a brownfield site. There will also be an improved Marina in and around Becket's Park and Midsummer Meadow.

The main shopping sector of Far Cotton is St Leonard's Road which connects Towcester Road and London Road. There are also shops on Gloucester Avenue. There is a Tesco Extra just south of Far Cotton in Mereway and an Asda supermarket in Cotton End on Ransome Road. A Waitrose supermarket opened in nearby Newport Pagnell Road in 2013 next to a garden centre.

As of 2010, Far Cotton is set to double in population in the next ten years with development of housing, much of this having already taken place in the Cotton End area.

1998 floods
In April 1998, many residents of Far Cotton had to leave their homes (albeit temporarily) and seek temporary accommodation elsewhere, after part of Far Cotton, along with another part of Northampton, St. James, suffered flooding, when the River Nene broke its banks. Flooding occurred on Good Friday, 10 April 1998, a day which became known locally as "the long Good Friday". Since that time river banks have been raised and flood mitigation lakes created west of the town.

Notable residents
Robert Adams, a sculptor and designer was born in Far Cotton.

Chief Inspector Walter Dew, who was involved in the hunt for both Jack the Ripper and Dr. Crippen, was born in the village in 1863.

References

External links 
Far Cotton History Group

Areas of Northampton